Antillia is a genus of flowering plants in the family Asteraceae.

There is only one known species, Antillia brachychaeta, native to Cuba.

References

Flora of Cuba
Eupatorieae
Flora without expected TNC conservation status